The Alabama State Hornets baseball team is the varsity intercollegiate baseball program of Alabama State University in Montgomery, Alabama, United States. The program's first season was in 1926, and it has been a member of the NCAA Division I Southwestern Athletic Conference since the start of the 1983 season. Its home venue is the Wheeler–Watkins Baseball Complex, located on Alabama State's campus. José Vázquez is the team's head coach starting in the 2017 season. The program has appeared in 2 NCAA Tournaments. It has won two conference tournament championships and 1 regular season conference title. As of the start of the 2018 Major League Baseball season, 1 former Hornet has appeared in Major League Baseball.

History

Early history
The program's first season of play was 1926.

Conference affiliations
 Southern Intercollegiate Athletic Conference (1926–1982)
 Southwestern Athletic Conference (1983–present)

Wheeler–Watkins Baseball Complex

The venue is named for two former Alabama State baseball coaches, Herbert Wheeler and Larry Watkins. Opened in March 2011, the facility has a capacity of 500 spectators.

Head coaches
Alabama State's longest tenured head coach was Larry Watkins, who has coached the team from 1982 to 2011.

Records

*Wheeler's record only shows 17 seasons, he has 8 years with unknown records.

Notable former players
Below is a list of notable former Hornets and the seasons in which they played for Alabama State.

 Harvey Branch (1957–1958)

See also
 List of NCAA Division I baseball programs

References

External links